The Australian Academy of Technology and Engineering (ATSE) is a learned academy that helps Australians understand and use technology to solve complex problems. It was founded in 1975 as one of Australia's then four learned academies (now five). Its original name was the 'Australian Academy of Technological Sciences', but in 1987 the name was lengthened to include Engineering, as 'Australian Academy of Technological Sciences and Engineering'. In 2015, the Academy adopted a new business name, the 'Australian Academy of Technology and Engineering', reserving the Australian Academy of Technological Sciences and Engineering as its company name.

The Academy operates as an independent, non-government, not-for-profit organisation.

Organisation

ATSE is composed of nearly 900 Fellows, bringing together Australia’s leading experts in applied science, technology and engineering to provide impartial, practical and evidence-based advice on how to achieve sustainable solutions and advance prosperity.

The Academy Governance structure consists of a Board, an Assembly (strategic advisory body), a number of Board Committees, policy-generating Forums, state and territory-based Divisions, and a professional Secretariat.

List of presidents
Sir Ian McLennan KCMG KBE FAA FTSE – 1975–1983
    Sir David Zeidler AC CBE FAA FTSE – 1984–1988
    Sir Rupert Myers KBE AO FAA FTSE – 1989–1994
    Sir Arvi Parbo AC FTSE – 1995–1997
    Mr M A (Tim) Besley AC FTSE – 1998–2002
    Professor John Zillman AO FAA FTSE – 2003–2006
Professor Robin Batterham AO FREng FAA FTSE 2007–2012
Dr Alan Finkel AO FAA FTSE 2013–2015
    Professor Peter Gray FTSE – 2015–2016
    Professor Hugh Bradlow FTSE – 2016–

Fellowship

Royal Fellow
The Academy inducted its Royal Fellow, Prince Philip, Duke of Edinburgh KG KT OM GBE AC PC FRS FAA FTSE, in 1977.

Foundation Fellows
Foundation Fellows include:
Prof Graeme Bird
Dr John Christian
Dr Bob Durie
Dr Keith Farrer
Dr John Gladstones
Em Prof Antoni Karbowiak
Dr Philip Law 
Prof Alec Lazenby
Sir Ian McLennan – Foundation President
Dr Robert Muncey
Sir Mark Oliphant
Prof June Olley
Prof David Solomon
Sir James Vernon
Dr Bob Ward
Prof Howard Worner

Honorary Fellows
Honorary Fellows include:

Elizabeth Broderick AO, a former Sex Discrimination Commissioner
Dame Marie Bashir AD, the former Governor of NSW
Tim Andrew Fischer AC, the former Deputy Prime Minister
John Landy AC, the former Olympian and Governor of Victoria
David Hurley, AC DSC, Governor-General of Australia, the former Governor of NSW

Fellows

Clunies-Ross Award
Founded in 1959 to perpetuate the memory of Sir Ian Clunies Ross, the Ian Clunies Ross Memorial Foundation promoted the development of science and technology in Australia's beneficial interest.

In November 2002, the Foundation was brought under the Academy's umbrella, securing the long-term future of the Awards. It became known as the Clunies Ross Foundation.

The Foundation established the Clunies Ross National Science & Technology Award in 1991. The Foundation was disbanded in 2004 and the Awards are now administered by the Academy in three categories.

See also
 Office of the Chief Scientist (Australia)

References

External links
 
Address by the Governor-General at the ATSE Clunies Ross Awards ceremony, 19 May 2011

Scientific organisations based in Australia
Technological Sciences and Engineering
Australian National Academies
1987 establishments in Australia

National academies of engineering